Lutel Malik James (born 2 June 1972) is a former professional footballer, who represented Saint Kitts and Nevis internationally. He played as a striker. He played in the Football League with Scarborough and Bury.

Playing career
After playing for Hyde United , James signed for Bury  in October 1998 on a £200-per-week deal. He was released by Bury in the summer of 2001. Despite praise from manager Andy Preece, the club was suffering from financial difficulties and was unable to offer James a new deal.

James signed for Acrrington Stanley ahead of the 2001/02 season. He scored 20 goals in his first season with the club and helped them earn promotion to the Conference. He was involved in an FA Cup win over Huddersfield Town. In October 2004, James spoke of his desire to leave Accrington after a lack of playing time and requested a transfer. After a three-month loan spell with Droylsden, he signed for Altrincham on a non-contract deal. He spent a short period on loan with Garforth Town before making his Altrincham debut against Southport. He was released by the club in November 2005 after making four total appearances.

Managerial career
James coached at Farsley Celtic academy.

In June 2020 he was appointed joint manager of Goole alongside Les Nelson.

International career
James represented St Kitts and Nevis internationally. In 2004, he declined a call up to the national team to focus on playing for his club side.

Personal life
After finishing his playing career, James worked as CEO of a Leeds-based youth club, Chapeltown Youth Development Centre.

As of 2022, James was a director at Yorkshire Amateur.

References

External links

Hyde United Player Statistics: Lutel James

1972 births
Living people
Footballers from Manchester
Saint Kitts and Nevis footballers
Saint Kitts and Nevis international footballers
English footballers
English sportspeople of Saint Kitts and Nevis descent
Association football forwards
Selby Town F.C. players
Yorkshire Amateur A.F.C. players
Scarborough F.C. players
Guiseley A.F.C. players
Hyde United F.C. players
Bury F.C. players
Accrington Stanley F.C. players
Droylsden F.C. players
Altrincham F.C. players
Garforth Town A.F.C. players
Bradford (Park Avenue) A.F.C. players
Goole A.F.C. managers
English football managers